The Rally for National Unity and Democracy (RUND) was a political party in Benin.

History
The party contested the 1999 elections, receiving 1.3% of the vote and winning a single seat, taken by Ibrahima Idrissou. However, the party's list for the 2003 elections was rejected by CENA.

Idrissou was the party's candidate in the 2006 presidential election. He received 0.6% of the vote, finishing thirteenth in a field of 26 candidates.

References

Defunct political parties in Benin